Arsher Ali (born 9 April 1984) is an English actor. He has played various TV and film roles, and is a regular lead performer at the Royal Shakespeare Company in Stratford-upon-Avon.

Personal life
Ali is of Pakistani descent. He is a graduate of East 15 Acting School. He married British-Iranian actress Roxy Shahidi in 2010. The couple had their first child, a daughter, in January 2018. Ali has been vocal throughout his career about the challenges faced by British Asian actors in the industry and his continual fight against racial typecasting.

Filmography

References

External links

21st-century English male actors
Actors from Nottingham
Alumni of East 15 Acting School
English people of Pakistani descent
English male actors of South Asian descent
English male film actors
English male television actors
Male actors from Nottinghamshire
People from Nottingham
1984 births
Living people